Ibrahima Khalil Gueye (born 8 October 1996) is a Senegalese professional footballer who plays as a forward.

References

1996 births
Living people
Senegalese footballers
Association football forwards
Swiss Super League players
Veikkausliiga players
FC Sion players
Vaasan Palloseura players
Senegalese expatriate footballers
Senegalese expatriate sportspeople in Switzerland
Expatriate footballers in Switzerland
Senegalese expatriate sportspeople in Finland
Expatriate footballers in Finland
FC Wil players